Zapadnovka is a rural locality (a settlement) with only eight streets, in Rossoshenskoye Rural Settlement, Gorodishchensky District, Volgograd Oblast, Russia. The population was 217 as of 2010. There are 8 streets.

Geography 
Zapadnovka is located in steppe, on the right bank of the Rossoshka River, 43 km west of Gorodishche (the district's administrative centre) by road. Rossoshka is the nearest rural locality.

References 

Rural localities in Gorodishchensky District, Volgograd Oblast